Euphemia "Effy" Irvine (28 August 1924 – February 2, 2018) was the first woman in Scotland to run a parish.

Life
Irvine was born in Clydebank on 28 August 1924. She was brought up in Jordanvale Parish Church in Glasgow and she left school when she was 14 and went to work in a plumbers office.

Irvine came to the ministry late. She had already left education and married when someone commented on her ability to speak. She decided that she wanted to work in the Church of Scotland and if she was going to speak then she needed to increase her qualifications. She decided to change her life after 16 years at home in 1968. She took a course at the University of London which enabled her to enrol on a course at the University of Glasgow.

As part of her course she was required to approach a Church of Scotland minister and find someone who she could work with. She chose the first-class cricketer James Aitchison who also served as a minister for 34 years. He was then minister of Broomhill in Glasgow and after asking advice from his church he agreed. While she was on the course the Church of Scotland decided that it would in principle accept women ministers. The church found this easier in Scotland than it would have been in England. Church of Scotland ministers are not expected to have any spiritual seniority but are just senior in the organisation.

She became the first woman minister in Scotland when she took on the parish of Campsie Trinity with Milton of Campsie on 1 June 1972. She had wanted to work in an urban area so she had turned down this position in the country four times before she accepted it. Irvine thought her parish had made a "leap of faith", but none of the congregation defected to other churches. Even though the first minister was appointed it was to be many years before the church had a woman moderator.

Six years later the parishes reorganised and Irvine agreed to stay on at Milton of Campsie until she retired in 1988. During her retirement she published ‘A Journey of Faith’ which was her autobiography.

She died in 2018.

References

1924 births
2018 deaths
Clergy from Glasgow
20th-century Ministers of the Church of Scotland
21st-century Ministers of the Church of Scotland